Charles Hyett (1677 or 1686 – 1738), of Painswick House, near Gloucester, Gloucestershire, was an English politician.

He was a Member (MP) for Gloucester in 1722–1727.

He built Painswick House to escape the smog of Gloucester but died not long after moving there.

References

1677 births
1738 deaths
People from Gloucester
British MPs 1722–1727
Members of the Parliament of Great Britain for English constituencies
Hyett family